Bardeh Rasheh (also Romanized as Bardah Rashah; also known as Bardrasheh) is a city in Khav and Mirabad Rural District, Khav and Mirabad District, Marivan County, Kurdistan Province, Iran. At the 2006 census, its population was 919, in 198 families. The village is populated by Kurds.

References 

Towns and villages in Marivan County
Cities in Kurdistan Province
Kurdish settlements in Kurdistan Province